Todd Wells is a professional cyclist specializing in mountain bike racing and cyclo-cross from the United States. Todd resides in Durango, Colorado and  Tucson, Arizona.  Wells races for the SRAM/TLD Factory Racing team for mountain bike racing.

In cyclo-cross, Wells captured the 2001, 2005 and 2010 USA Cycling Cyclocross National Championships.

In mountain bike Wells is a 12 time National Champion in XC, STXC and Marathon. He is a 3x  Leadville Trail 100 winner, 3x Pan Am Champion as well as winner of La Ruta de los Conquistadores

Major results 

 2018
1st, Telluride 100 Mtn. Bike Race
 2016
*1st, USA Cycling Marathon National Championship
1st  Leadville Trail 100
1st, Sea Otter Classic XC
1st Whiskey 50 Fat Tire Crit
1st Grand Junction Off Road Marathon and Fat Tire Crit
1st Blitz to the Barrel
3rd Carson City Off Road Marathon
Overall Winner Epic Rides Series
2nd, National Short Track Mountain Bike Championships
1st Breck Epic Stage 2
1st Breck Epic Stage 4
1st Breck Epic Stage Rac;e Overall
1st Gesta Heroica MX
 2015
*1st, USA Cycling Marathon National Championship
1st, Fontana PROXCT STXC
2nd, Bonelli #2 PROXCT STXC
2nd, Sea Otter Classic STXC
 2014
*1st, USA Cycling Cross Country National Championship 
*1st, USA Cycling Marathon National Championship
2nd, USA Cycling Short Track National Championship 
PROXCT Overall Champion 
1st, Leadville Trail 100
1st, Colorado Springs PROXCT XC
1st, Subaru Cup PROXCT XC
1st, Missoula PROXCT STXC
1st, Sea Otter Classic STXC
1st, La Ruta Stage 3
2nd, Whiskey 50
 2013
*1st, USA Cycling Marathon National Championship
*1st, USA Cycling Short Track National Championship
2nd, USA Cycling Cross Country National Championship
1st, PROXCT Overall Champion
1st, Breck Epic Stage Race Overall
1st, Breck Epic Stage 1
1st, Breck Epic Stage 2
1st, Breck Epic Stage 3
1st, Breck Epic Stage 5
1st, Fontana PROXCT XC
1st, Fontana PROXCT STXC
1st, Bump and Grind PROXCT XC
1st, Subaru Cup PROXCT XC
1st, Subaru Cup PROXCT STXC
2012
Member USA Olympic Mountain Bike Team London
*1st, USA Cycling Marathon National Championship
1st, USA Cycling Short Track National Championship
1st, Pan Am Championships
*1st, PROXCT Overall Champion
2nd, USA Cycling Cross Country National Championship
10th, London Olympic MTB
4th, UCI World Cup Wyndham
 2011
*1st, USA Cycling Cross Country National Championship
2nd, USA Cycling Short Track National Championship
1st, Sea Otter Classic XC
7th, UCI Mountain Bike World Championship Switzerland
 1st Leadville Trail 100
 1st La Ruta de los Conquistadores
1st, La Ruta de los Conquistadores Stage 1
 2010
* 1st, USA Cycling Cyclocross National Championships
 1st, USA Cycling Short Track National Championships
 1st, USA Cycling Cross Country National Championships
1st, Pan America Championship Guatemala
1st, Fontana US Cup XC
2009
1st, Sea Otter Classic STXC
1st, Sand Creek PROXCT
2nd, USA Cycling Short Track National Championship
1st, Jingle Cross UCI Cyclocross
1st, Jingle Cross UCI Cyclocross
8th, UCI Mountain Bike World Championship
2008
Member USA Olympic Mountain Bike Team Beijing
5th, UCI World Cup Canberra
6th, UCI World Cup Andorra
1st, Boulder UCI Cyclocross
1st, West Windsor UCI Cyclocross
1st, Southampton UCI Cyclocross
1st, Jingle Cross UCI Cyclocross
2007
3rd, Pan American Championship Argentina
1st, Jingle Cross UCI Cyclocross
1st, Rhode Island UCI Cyclocross
1st, W.E. Stedman Grand Prix UCI Cyclocross
1st, Durango Squawker UCI Cyclocross
1st, Gunnison Mountaineer UCI Cyclocross
3rd, USA Cycling Cyclocross National Championship
2006
1st, Boulder UCI Cyclocross
1st, Ultimate Dirt Challenge Cross Country UCI
 2005
* 1st, USA Cycling Cyclocross National Championships
*1st, Liberty Cup Rhode Island UCI Cyclocross
1st, WE Stedman CO Grand Prix UCI Cyclocross
 1st, San Francisco Cyclocross Grand Prix
 1st, Park City Utah NORBA National MTB Short Track (STXC)
 1st, Puerto Rico UCI MTB
 2nd, National Championship MTB XC
 2nd, National Championship MTB STXC
2nd, Tour of Connecticut Overall
1st, Stage 4 Tour of the Gila
 2004
Member USA Olympic Team Mountain Bike Athens
 1st, Aspen NORBA National MTB XC
1st, Ultimate Dirt Challenge UCI Cross Country
 14th, UCI MTB World Championship
10th, UCI Mountain Bike World Cup Calgary
1st, Lower Allen Classic UCI Cyclocross
1st, Highland Park UCI Cyclocross
1st, Gear Works Bay State UCI Cyclocross
2nd, USA Cycling Cyclocross National Championship
2003
1st, Brisbane UCI Cyclocross
1st, Wilmington UCI Cyclocross
1st, Gloucester UCI Cyclocross
1st, Bianchi San Mateo UCI Cyclocross
2nd, USA Cycling Cyclocross National Championship
2002
* 1st, National Championship MTB Short Track (STXC)
1st, Worcester UCI Cyclocross
1st, Portland UCI Cyclocross
1st, Clif Bar Grand Prix UCI Cyclocross
1st, Saturn UCI Cyclocross
1st, Salt Lake City UCI Cyclocross
1st, Napa Valley UCI Cyclocross
 2001
 1st, USA Cycling Cyclocross National Championships
1996
 1st, Collegiate MTB National Championship
1995
 1st, Collegiate MTB National Championship

References

External links

 Official site

 TargeTraining.com biography

Living people
American male cyclists
Cyclo-cross cyclists
Cyclists at the 2004 Summer Olympics
Cyclists at the 2008 Summer Olympics
Cyclists at the 2012 Summer Olympics
Olympic cyclists of the United States
Cross-country mountain bikers
Sportspeople from Kingston, New York
1975 births
American mountain bikers
American cyclo-cross champions